The Harry B. Merrihew Drugstore, is a historic commercial building in Lehi, Utah, United States, that is listed on the National Register of Historic Places (NRHP).

Description
Located at 1st West and Main streets, it was built in 1899.

It was listed on the NRHP July 23, 1982. When listed, it was one of only two remaining pre-1900 Early Commercial style buildings in Lehi.

See also

 National Register of Historic Places listings in Utah County, Utah

References

External links

Commercial buildings on the National Register of Historic Places in Utah
Buildings designated early commercial in the National Register of Historic Places
Commercial buildings completed in 1899
Buildings and structures in Lehi, Utah
1899 establishments in Utah
National Register of Historic Places in Utah County, Utah